Dillenia retusa is a plant endemic to the island of Sri Lanka, there are records in the forests of Bolampatti and Anamalai hills. An ornamental, moderate sized tree, twigs and peduncles are glabrous. Leaves blunt at tip, cuneate at base, serrate, glabrous. Flowers 6–8 cm across, petals spathulate, narrow. Fruit enclosed by sepals.

Vernacular names
Sinhalese:Godapara
Tamil:Naiteku
Telgu:Chinna Kalinga

Ecology
Disturbed sites, scrub.

Uses
Wood - furniture, light construction; fruit - medicinal.

References

External links
 http://indiabiodiversity.org/species/show/223809
 https://www.thieme-connect.com/products/ejournals/abstract/10.1055/s-0031-1273640
 http://www.instituteofayurveda.org/plants/plants_detail.php?i=409&s=Family_name

Endemic flora of Sri Lanka
retusa